Geoffrey Woodcroft is a Canadian Anglican bishop who has been the 13th Bishop of Rupert's Land since 2018.

Woodcroft was educated at Huron University College. Woodcroft was ordained a priest in 1990. He served in the Diocese of Algoma before moving to the Diocese of Rupert's Land to take up the ministry of chaplain at St. John's College, University of Manitoba. He was the incumbent at St Paul, Fort Garry, Winnipeg from 2003 until his election to the episcopate.

References

Year of birth missing (living people)
21st-century Anglican Church of Canada bishops
Anglican bishops of Rupert's Land
Living people